Kumaçukuru is a former village in Mut district of Mersin Province, Turkey which is now only a legal entity with a population of 3.

References

Villages in Mut District